The Shadows, Kith and Kin is a collection of short fiction by Joe R. Lansdale, published in 2007 in a limited edition by Subterranean Press. This book has long since sold out.

It contains:

 A Quick Author's Note
 "The Shadows, Kith and Kin"
 "Deadman's Road"
 "The Long Dead Day"
 "White Mule, Spotted Pig"
 "Bill, the Little Steam Shovel" (illustrated by Mark A. Nelson)
 "Alone" (with Melissa Mia Hall)
 "The Events Concerning a Nude Fold-Out Found in a Harlequin Romance"
 "The Gentleman's Hotel"

"The Events Concerning a Nude Fold-Out Found in a Harlequin Romance" was previously included in his 1993 paperback collection Bestsellers Guaranteed. It was also included in Electric Gumbo (1994) and The Long Ones (1999).

References

External links
Author's Official Website
Publisher's Website

Short story collections by Joe R. Lansdale
2007 short story collections
Horror short story collections
Works by Joe R. Lansdale
Subterranean Press books